The Lancia Thema (Type 834) is an executive car produced by the Italian automaker Lancia between 1984 and 1994, and one of four cars to share the Type Four platform alongside the Alfa Romeo 164, Fiat Croma and Saab 9000. The Thema was first shown in Turin Motor Show in 1984.

In February 2011, it was reported that the second generation of the Chrysler 300C, due for launch later that year, would be marketed as Lancia Thema in all European markets, except the UK and Ireland, which would retain the 300C nameplate.

First generation (1984 - 1994)

Overview
The Thema was Lancia's luxury car based on the all-new Type Four platform, co-designed with the Fiat Croma, Saab 9000 and Alfa Romeo 164.
The Thema was available as a saloon and as a station wagon designed and produced by Pininfarina.

First series
The Lancia Thema was announced in May 1984, then introduced to the motoring press with an event held in October 1984 in Vienna, and to the general public at the Turin Motor Show in November of the same year.
The first series Thema was built between 1984 and 1988, with four different models initially available. Two came with a twin cam 8-valve, fuel injected 1,995 cc 4-cylinder petrol engine, in naturally aspirated guise on the Thema i.e. or turbocharged and intercooled on the Thema i.e. turbo. Engine output was 120 PS and 165 PS respectively. The most expensive model was the Thema 6V, powered by a 150 PS, 2,849 cc V6, tuned for smoothness. On most European markets a 2,445 cc, 100 PS four-cylinder turbocharged and intercooled four-cylinder diesel engine was also available, on the Thema turbo ds. 1986 saw the introduction of the Pininfarina-designed Thema Station Wagon, available with the two turbocharged engines only, and of the Ferrari V8-engined Thema 8·32.

Second series
The second series Thema was presented in the Paris Motor Show in September 1988. The 8-valve 2-litre, now producing , remained on sale on the Thema i.e. base model. The  six-cylinder on the Thema V6 was only mildly revised.

A number of small visual updates were made to freshen the Thema's look. Upfront there was a more prominent grille with vertical instead of horizontal bars, and the turn indicators had been moved beneath the main headlamp units, under horizontal dark-tinted lenses. At the rear all model badging was removed, and the turn signals and backup lamp lenses were now tinted red. Finally the side rubbing strips, side skirts, wheel covers and 8-spoke alloy wheels were redesigned. The station wagon and the 8·32 received similar updates. With five engines available of the saloon, three on the SW (the two 16-valve petrols and the turbo diesel) and the 8·32, the Thema range consisted of nine different models. The different models received almost no visual distinctions, aside from the 8·32. Other models looked largely identical aside from badging, wheel dimensions, and wheel design (along with body-coloured mirror housings on top versions). Additionally the 4- and 6-cylinder petrol engines were also produced in catalytic converter-equipped versions, with slightly reduced output, for sale on markets where such equipment was mandatory.

Third series
The series two was then replaced by the facelifted third and last series, introduced in the Paris Motor Show in September 1992 and produced from 1992-1994. Four trim levels—base, LE, LS and LX—were introduced across the range; the 2.9-litre V6 engine was replaced by a more powerful 175 PS 3.0-litre unit, sourced from Alfa Romeo.

Production of the Thema ceased in 1994, when Lancia also withdrew entirely from RHD markets (including the United Kingdom) in response to falling sales. The Thema was replaced by the Lancia Kappa. A total of over 336,000 Thema saloons were produced.

Variants

The station wagon
In addition to the saloon, a station wagon was jointly developed and produced by Lancia and Pininfarina in Grugliasco. It was shown in prototype form at the September 1985 Frankfurt Motor Show, and in definitive form at the March 1986 Geneva Motor Show. Zagato had also shown a station wagon proposal earlier, at the 1985 Geneva Motor Show. This prototype, which remained a design study, with a larger glass area in the rear and with more discreet D-pillars than for the Pininfarina variant.

Pininfarina was also tasked with producing the new bodystyle. The Lancia factory assembled all the body-in-white parts shared with the saloon; the incomplete bodies were sent to Pininfarina, where they were completed and painted, and final assembly was carried out. The station wagon version was never offered in a right-hand drive variant. In total 21,074 Thema station wagons would be built by Pininfarina between 1986 and 1994 in their Borgo San Paolo plant.

Thema 8·32

First shown at the Turin Auto Show in 1986, the Lancia Thema 8·32 ("8" standing for the number of cylinders and "32" for the number of valves) was assembled at Lancia's S. Paolo plant in Turin. It used a 2,927 cc, Tipo F105L, Ferrari V8. This engine was based on the unit used in the Ferrari 308 and in the Ferrari Mondial Quattrovalvole, and some of the componentry was assembled by Ducati from castings made at Maranello. The engine differed from other Ferrari V8s of the time in that it was equipped with a cross-plane type crankshaft rather than the usual flat-plane crankshaft, smaller valves and different firing order: all this was to make the engine characteristics more suitable for a four-door luxury saloon. The transmission was a 5-speed manual gearbox; there was no automatic option. The braking system used larger 294 mm vented front discs and the standard 251 mm rear ones from the other Themas.

All 8·32s featured Bosch KE3 Jetronic fuel injection, ABS, ZF's brand new Servotronic electronically controlled rack-and-pinion power steering (which varied steering wheel effort according to vehicle speed), and a retractable rear spoiler. The latter, designed to increase high speed stability, was controlled by the driver via a rotary switch on the right stalk. In closed position, it would fit flush with the boot lid.
The tyres were specially developed 205/55 VR15 Goodyears on five-spoke 6J×15 alloy wheels.

The car offered a handmade wood-and-Alcantara (or optional Poltrona Frau leather) interior, and was complete with similar luxury equipment as LX versions of the Thema. Stitched leather covered the entire dashboard, the steering wheel (including centre), gear and handbrake levers and booths, centre console, door panels and sun visors, while the headlining was Alcantara. A bespoke dashboard fascia housed two main instruments, six small auxiliary gauges, and triple round air conditioning vents. Like the door cappings and the lids concealing the radio and ashtray, it was veneered in matte varnish burr wood. The instrumentation had black dials with yellow hands and markings; it included water thermometer, oil thermometer and pressure gauge, and check panels for the lights and the drivetrain. The seats (and matching door panel inserts) were trimmed in beige or date brown Alcantara as standard, with black or brown leather was an optional extra. Brown interiors got colour-matching switchgear, carpets and trim. Irrespective of interior selection, Thema 8·32 buyers could choose from five paint colours, all metallics: Blizzard Blue, Winner Red, Quartz Grey, Reflex Green and Black. A double hand-painted pinstripe (the upper matched to body colour, the lower yellow) ran along the sides and the rear of the car. Besides the paint scheme, retractable spoiler and wheels, the only exterior details setting the 8·32 apart from other Themas were yellow "8·32" badges, a silver eggcrate-type grille, and twin exhaust outlets. Some notable options were automatic climate control, electrically actuated sunroof, provision for a car phone in the front armrest, and rear individual power seats.

In 1988 the 8·32 received series 2 updates like other Themas, including new lights front and rear, a smaller grille badge, removal of model badging at the rear and on the side skirts, and the new side rubbing strips (previously absent on this model). There were no third series 8·32s. This version of the Thema was produced in limited numbers, with 2370 Series 1 built between 1986 and 1988 and 1601 Series 2 built between 1989 and 1992. All were left-hand drive, although one Thema 8·32 was converted to right hand drive by TAK Motor Co. in South Africa in 1987 for the MD of TAK.

The Thema 8·32's key competitors were some of the fastest saloon models of the late 1980s including the Audi 100 Quattro, BMW M535i, Ford Sierra RS Cosworth, Saab 9000 2.3 Turbo S, and the Vauxhall Lotus Carlton/Opel Lotus Omega. Road & Track described the 8.32 as one of the "one of the weirder sleepers to come out of the 1980s".

Towards the end of his life, Enzo Ferrari owned an 8.32 as his personal transport.

Thema Limousine
 
Built only on request for wealthy customers and Fiat Group executives, the Lancia Thema Limousine featured the same interior as the LX and the 8.32 versions. Most of them were powered by a 2.8 L PRV V6 engine, replaced in the last ones by the 3.0 L Alfa Romeo V6 engine. Only 24 Thema Limousines were built. The price, meanwhile, was up nearly sixty percent over a comparably equipped regular wheelbase Thema V6.

Engines
With the exception of the 8.32 Ferrari engine, Thema powerplants originated from the Fiat engine series designed by Aurelio Lampredi, the famed engine designer formerly of Ferrari and Alfa Romeo. The straight-4 2.0 L petrol engine, available in both naturally aspirated and turbocharged versions, was refined and offered good performance. Earlier Themas were also offered with a 2.8 L PRV V6 engine, developed in cooperation with Peugeot, Renault, and Volvo. This unit was replaced in 1992 with a 3.0 L Alfa Romeo V6 engine (Fiat had bought Alfa Romeo in 1986 and gained access to this engine).

Second generation (2011 – 2014) 

Chrysler marketed the 300C for model years 2011-2014 as the Lancia Thema in Europe's left hand drive markets. Right-hand drive markets (the United Kingdom and Ireland) kept the Chrysler 300C badging.

Powertrain

Notes

References

Thema
Front-wheel-drive vehicles
Executive cars
Sedans
Station wagons

1990s cars
Cars introduced in 1984
Cars discontinued in 2014